Summa Nachunu Irukku ( It is Just Amazing) is a 2013 Tamil-language comedy film directed by A. Venkatesh, who also starred in the film. The film stars Thaman Kumar, Vibha Natarajan and Archana Vishwanath along with an ensemble cast including Thambi Ramaiah, Srinivasan, Appukutty, and Erode Mahesh. The film, produced by B. Vimal, had musical score by Achu Rajamani and was released on 30 August 2013. The story of the film was inspired by the 1997 Malayalam film Chandralekha.

Plot
Kannan (Thaman Kumar), who has a lot of debt, comes from his village to find a job in Chennai. There, he becomes an auto driver. He then saves Anjali (Vibha Natarajan), the daughter of Gautham (A. Venkatesh). Gautham, also known as Dato, is a wealthy man in Malaysia. Kannan takes Anjali to a hospital and is mistaken by the doctors to be her husband. Most of the relatives and Gautham also mistake him for the husband. In the meantime, Anjali falls into a coma. Kannan cannot tell the truth because of his family's debt. Kannan, his friend Gunaseelan (Erode Mahesh), and his boss Chinniah (Thambi Ramaiah) take off to Malaysia along with Anjali's family. Appukutty (Appukutty), Gautham's cook, becomes suspicious of Kannan's identity. In addition to this enters Anjali's sister Ranjini (Archana Vishwanath). What transpires later forms the crux of the story.

Cast

Thaman Kumar as Kannan
Vibha Natarajan as Anjali/Gayathri
Archana Vishwanath as Ranjini
Thambi Ramaiah as Chinniah
Erode Mahesh as Gunaseelan
Srinivasan as Ashok Rajendran and Rajendran
Appukutty as Appukutty
A. Venkatesh as Gautham (Dato)
Vennira Aadai Moorthy as Bank Manager
Vasu Vikram as Chidambaram
Nirosha as Chithra
Vanitha Vijayakumar as Kavitha
Crane Manohar
Muthukaalai
Scissor Manohar
Boys Rajan as Gautam's manager

Production
A. Venkatesh, who has been an action film director all along, discussed a comic storyline with director Sneha Britto as he has not done a comedy movie until now. B. Vimal, Sneha Britto's father, accepted to produce the film. A. Venkatesh spotted Thaman Kumar in Sattam Oru Iruttarai. Thereafter, Thaman Kumar was signed to appear in the lead role with Vibha Natarajan and newcomer Archana Vishwanath. Thambi Ramaiah, Appukutty and Erode Mahesh were also part of the cast, while Srinivasan signed on to play the comedic villain. Achu Rajamani signed to score the music. V. T. Vijayan and N. Ganeshkumar handled the editing department, respectively, while C. J. Rajkumar was selected as the cinematographer and Erode Mahesh has written the dialogues. The film was mainly shot in Malaysia. A. Venkatesh said : "Summa Nachunu Irukku is an out and out comedy. We have just made this film to make every one laugh for 2 and a half hours".

Soundtrack

The film score and the soundtrack were composed by Achu Rajamani (except Kannan Indru and Dian Dian by LockUp Nathan from Malaysia). The soundtrack features 5 tracks with lyrics written by Na. Muthukumar and Vimala Britto. The audio launch took place on 24 April 2013. G. V. Prakash Kumar, S. Thaman, Dharan Kumar, S. A. Chandrasekhar, Abirami Ramanathan, T. Rajendar, Thambi Ramaiah, Nakul, Hari Kumar, Gautham Karthik and Sneha Britto attended the function.
Behindwoods.com said : "A fair commercial effort from Achu" and gave it 2 out of 5 stars.

Reception
Behindwoods.com gave it 1.5 out of 5 stars and said: "On the whole Summa Nachunu Irukku is a movie that lacks clarity on the genre it wants to fall under". M. Suganth from The Times of India gave the film 2.5 out of 5 stars and stated that "The only thing it lacks is the pizzaz to make it genuinely funny".

References

External links

2013 films
2010s Tamil-language films
2013 comedy films
Indian slapstick comedy films
Films scored by Achu Rajamani
Films shot in Malaysia
Tamil remakes of Malayalam films
Films directed by A. Venkatesh (director)